Phyllonorycter trinotella is a moth of the family Gracillariidae. It is known from Québec in Canada and New Jersey, Maine, Connecticut, Ohio, Vermont and Michigan in the United States.

The wingspan is about 5 mm.

The larvae feed on Acer species, including Acer platanoides, Acer rubrum and Acer saccharinum. They mine the leaves of their host plant. The mine has the form of a small tentiform, much wrinkled mine on the underside of the leaf.

References

trinotella
Moths of North America
Moths described in 1908